The 1933 Kategoria e Dytë is the third season of the second tier of football in Albania. The league was played between 2 April and 13 August 1933 and it was divided into 3 groups, Group A being an exhibition tournament and the winners of Group B and C played each other in the final. The final was played between Bashkimi Elbasan and SK Vlorë, which Bashkimi Elbasan was 3-2.

Group A

Played as an exhibition tournament

Group B

Bashkimi Elbasan won the group

Group C

SK Vlorë won the group

Final

Both games were annulled and a rematch was scheduled

Rematch

Winning team
Bashkimi Elbasan

 Hysen Gjylaçi (GK)
 Mehmet Haxhihasani (GK)
 Maksut Ismaili (GK)
 Hajri Kapllani
 Muharrem Musta 
 Sefedin Biçaku
 Shefqet Bizhuta
 Haxhi Çiftja
 Xhavit Saraçi
 Lec Shllaku
 Shefqet Graceni
 Behexhet Jolldashi
 Rifat Jolldashi
 Hysen Struga
 Q. Tafani
 Reshit Tola
 M. Stambollxhiu
 Faik Pajuni
 Abas Xhafa
Coach: Ahmet Haxhihasani

References

Kategoria e Parë seasons
Albania
Albania
2